Luis Antonio Álvarez Murillo (born 13 April 1991, in Mexicali), also known as El Abuelo (The Grandfather), is a Mexican athlete who competes in archery.

Álvarez was selected as a member of the Mexican male archery team to compete at the 2012 Summer Olympics at London, after winning the 2012 Archery World Cup in Ogden, United States. This was the first Olympic games for the Mexican archer. At the 2012 Olympics, in the men's individual event, he was ranked 30th after the ranking round.  He then beat Yavor Khristov in the first elimination round, before being beaten by eventual gold medallist Oh Jin-Hyek in the second round. In the men's team event, Mexico beat Malaysia and France before losing to Italy in the semifinal.  Mexico lost out on the bronze medal, losing the bronze medal match to South Korea 215–219.

He won the bronze medal with Alejandra Valencia in the inaugural archery mixed team event at the 2020 Summer Olympics.

References

External links
 
 

1991 births
Sportspeople from Mexicali
Living people
Olympic archers of Mexico
Archers at the 2012 Summer Olympics
Mexican male archers
Archers at the 2015 Pan American Games
Archers at the 2019 Pan American Games
Pan American Games gold medalists for Mexico
Pan American Games medalists in archery
Central American and Caribbean Games gold medalists for Mexico
Competitors at the 2014 Central American and Caribbean Games
Central American and Caribbean Games silver medalists for Mexico
Central American and Caribbean Games medalists in archery
Medalists at the 2015 Pan American Games
Archers at the 2020 Summer Olympics
Medalists at the 2020 Summer Olympics
Olympic medalists in archery
Olympic bronze medalists for Mexico
20th-century Mexican people
21st-century Mexican people